Adam Bland (born 26 August 1982) is an Australian professional golfer who has played on a number of the world's golf tours.

Bland turned professional in 2005 and plays on the PGA Tour of Australasia. He won the 2005 Western Australia PGA Championship on the tour's developmental tour, the Von Nida Tour. He also played on the Gateway Tour in 2005 and had five top-10 finishes. He played on the Canadian Tour in 2007 and 2008 with six top-10s including two wins in 2007. He played on the Nationwide Tour (now Web.com Tour) from 2009 to 2011 with his best finish a playoff loss to Troy Merritt in the 2009 Mexico Open. 

He began playing on the Japan Golf Tour in 2014 and won the third event of the 2015 season, the Japan PGA Championship Nissin Cupnoodles Cup.

Professional wins (4)

Japan Golf Tour Tour wins (1)

Canadian Tour wins (2)

Von Nida Tour wins (1)

Playoff record
PGA Tour of Australasia playoff record (0–1)

Nationwide Tour playoff record (0–1)

Results in major championships

CUT = missed the halfway cut
Note: Bland only played in The Open Championship.

Results in World Golf Championships
Results not in chronological order before 2015.

"T" = Tied

Team appearances
Amateur
Australian Men's Interstate Teams Matches (representing South Australia): 2002, 2003, 2004

References

External links

Australian male golfers
PGA Tour of Australasia golfers
PGA Tour golfers
Japan Golf Tour golfers
Left-handed golfers
People from Mildura
1982 births
Living people